The 2022 Townsville Blackhawks season is the eighth in the club's history. Coached by Aaron Payne and captained by Josh Chudleigh, they competed in the Hostplus Cup.

Season summary

Milestones
 Round 1: Jake Bourke, Tom Chester, Jordan Lipp, Kayleb Milne and Emry Pere made their debuts for the club.
 Round 1: Tom Chester scored his first try for the club.
 Round 2: Zac McMinn and Taniela Sadrugu made their debuts for the club.
 Round 2: Taniela Sadrugu scored his first try for the club.
 Round 3: Iosefo Baleiwairiki made his debut for the club.
 Round 3: Jordan Lipp, Aaron Moore and Emry Pere scored their first tries for the club.
 Round 4: Iosefo Baleiwairiki scored his first try for the club.
 Round 9: Oscar Carter and Justin Frain made their debuts for the club.
 Round 9: Justin Frain scored his first try for the club.
 Round 11: Zac Laybutt and D'Jazirhae Pua'avase made their debuts for the club.
 Round 11: Zac Laybutt and D'Jazirhae Pua'avase scored their first tries for the club.
 Round 11: Kyle Laybutt played his 80th game for the club, overtaking Sam Hoare was the club's most capped player.
 Round 13 Eddie Hampson made his debut for the club.
 Round 13: Zac McMinnm scored his first try for the club.
 Round 14: Edene Gebbie made his debut for the club.
 Round 14: Edene Gebbie and Eddie Hampson scored their first tries for the club.
 Round 16: Kulikefu Finefeuiaki and Jaymon Moore made their debuts for the club.
 Round 16: Jake Bourke scored his first try for the club.

2022 squad

Squad movement

Gains

Losses

Fixtures

Pre-season

Regular season

Statistics

References

2022 in Australian rugby league
2022 in rugby league by club
Townsville Blackhawks